The 11th Annual Transgender Erotica Awards was a pornographic awards event recognizing the best in transgender pornography form the previous year from  November 15, 2017 - November 15, 2018. Pre-nominations were open from October 4 to October 23, 2018.

The public-at-large was able to suggest nominees using an online form. Nominees were announced on November 26, 2018, online on the theteashow.com website, with fan voting opening on the same day. The winners were announced during the awards on March 17, 2019. The awards open to fan voting were the fan award which was open to all and site-specific awards which were open to members of the forums of the specific sites who met specific criteria regarding; a number of postings and a date to have been a member before.

Winners and nominees
The nominations for the 11th Transgender Erotica Awards were announced online on November 26, 2018, and opened to fan voting on the same day, when pre-nominations closed, online on the theteashow.com website. The winners were announced during the awards on March 17, 2019.

Awards
Winners are listed first, highlighted in boldface.

References

Transgender Erotica Awards
Pornographic film awards
21st-century awards
American pornographic film awards
Annual events in the United States
Awards established in 2008
Culture of Los Angeles
Adult industry awards